The First Nawaz Sharif provincial cabinet was formed by Nawaz Sharif in April 1985 to begin a new government following the 1985 Pakistani general election. It was dissolved on 30 May 1988.

Cabinet

Ministers
Following were the members of the cabinet:
 Ch Abdul Ghafoor (PP-229 – Bahawalnagar) — Agriculture, Law and Parliamentary Affairs
 Ch Muhammad Iqbal (PP-137 – Gujranwala) — Revenue, Relief & Consolidations
 Ch Mumtaz Hussain (PP-201 – Sahiwal) — Education, Finance, Excise and Taxation
 Chaudhry Pervaiz Elahi (PP-28 – Gujrat) — Local Government and Rural Development
 Makhdoom Altaf Ahmed (PP-236 – Rahim Yar Khan) — Finance (Additional charge Excise and Taxation)
 Malik Khuda Bakhsh Khan Tiwana (PP-39 – Khushab) — Auqaf, Local Government and Rural Development
 Malik Saleem Iqbal (PP-16 – Chakwal) — Co-operatives, Fisheries and Wildlife
 Mehr Ghulam Dastgir Lak (PP-43 – Sargodha) — Food Department
 Shaheen Atiq-ur-Rehman (Women Seat) — Social Welfare & Women's Division
 Abdul Qayyum Awan (PP-69 – Faisalabad) — Labour, Jails, Zakat and Usher
 Abdul Razzaq (PP-160 – Khanewal) — Irrigation and Power
 Ghulam Haider Wyne (PP-161 – Khanewal) — Industries & Mineral Development, Planning and Development and Education
 Muhammad Arshad Khan Lodhi (PP-204 – Sahiwal) — Colonies, Revenue and Relief, Consolidation, Live Stock and Dairy Development
 Saeed Ahmed Khan Manais (PP-178 – Vehari) — Communication and Works, Food and Transport
 Saeed Ahmed Qureshi (PP-169 – Multan) — Zakat and Ushr
 Raja Iqbal Mehdi (PP-20 – Jhelum) — Forestry, Wildlife & Fisheries. 
 Sardar Arif Rashid (PP-109 – Lahore) — Agriculture, Irrigation and Power, Forestry, Tourism and Culture
 Syed Afzaal Ali Shah (PP-216 – Okara) — Health, Communication and Works
 Syeda Sajida Nayyar Abidi (PP-142 – Sialkot) — Livestock & Dairy Development
 Raja Khalique Ullah Khan (PP-129 – Gujranwala), Law & Parliamentary Affairs

References

Nawaz Sharif
1985 establishments in Pakistan
Cabinets established in 1985
1980s in Pakistan
1980s in politics
Punjab, Pakistan ministries